Racovăț may refer to:

 Racovăț, a commune in Soroca district, Moldova
 Racovăț, a village in Pomârla Commune, Botoșani County, Romania
 Racovăț (Prut), a tributary of the Prut in Moldova
 Racovăț, a tributary of the Bahna in Mehedinți County, Romania

See also 
 Racova (disambiguation)